Misao (written: 操 or みさを in hiragana) is a unisex Japanese given name. Notable people with the name include:

, Japanese philosophy student and poet
, Japanese textile artist, weaver and educator
, Japanese murderer
, Japanese biathlete
, Japanese high jumper
, Japanese footballer
, Japanese swimmer
 Misao, a Serbian publication

Fictional characters
, a character in the anime series Magical Girl Pretty Sammy
, protagonist of the manga series Black Bird
, a character in the manga series Lucky Star
, a character in the manga series Rurouni Kenshin
, a character in the light novel series Asura Cryin'
, a character in the video game Gate Keepers
, a character in the manga series First Love Limited

Japanese unisex given names